Rexford Paul Dawson (born February 10, 1889 – October 20, 1958) was a Major League Baseball pitcher for the Washington Senators. He played his only major league game on October 3, 1913. He was born in Mount Vernon, Washington, and grew up in North Vancouver, British Columbia.

His brother Joe also played in the Majors.

References

External links

1889 births
1958 deaths
Sportspeople from British Columbia
Major League Baseball pitchers
Baseball players from Washington (state)
Washington Senators (1901–1960) players
Missoula (minor league baseball) players
Vancouver Beavers players
Indianapolis Indians players
Lincoln Tigers players
Vernon Tigers players
People from Mount Vernon, Washington
Murray Infants players